Kubacki (feminine Kubacka) is a Polish surname. Notable people with the surname include:

 Dawid Kubacki (born 1990), Polish ski jumper
 Rafał Kubacki (born 1967), Polish judoka
 Rebecca Kubacki, American politician

Polish-language surnames